Howden Hume (30 March 1903 – 28 May 1981) was a British sailor. He competed in the 6 Metre event at the 1948 Summer Olympics.

References

External links
 

1903 births
1981 deaths
British male sailors (sport)
Olympic sailors of Great Britain
Sailors at the 1948 Summer Olympics – 6 Metre
Sportspeople from Glasgow